Bilbo Baggins is the title character and protagonist of J. R. R. Tolkien's 1937 novel The Hobbit, a supporting character in The Lord of the Rings, and the fictional narrator (along with Frodo Baggins) of many of Tolkien's Middle-earth writings. The Hobbit is selected by the wizard Gandalf to help Thorin and his party of Dwarves to reclaim their ancestral home and treasure, which has been seized by the dragon Smaug. Bilbo sets out in The Hobbit timid and comfort-loving, and through his adventures grows to become a useful and resourceful member of the quest.

Bilbo's way of life in the Shire, defined by features like the availability of tobacco and a postal service, recalls that of the English middle class during the Victorian to Edwardian eras. This is not compatible with the much older world of Dwarves and Elves. Tolkien appears to have based Bilbo on the designer William Morris's travels in Iceland; Morris liked his home comforts, but grew through his adventurous journeying. Bilbo's quest has been interpreted as a pilgrimage of grace, in which he grows in wisdom and virtue, and as a psychological journey towards wholeness.

Bilbo has appeared in numerous radio and film adaptations of The Hobbit and The Lord of the Rings, and in video games based on them. Several astronomical features and both living and fossil species have been named for him.

Appearances

The Hobbit

The protagonist of The Hobbit, Bilbo Baggins, is a hobbit in comfortable middle age. He is hired as a "burglar", despite his initial objections, on the recommendation of the wizard Gandalf and 13 Dwarves led by their king in exile, Thorin Oakenshield. The company of dwarves are on a quest to reclaim the Lonely Mountain and its treasures from the dragon Smaug. The adventure takes Bilbo and his companions through the wilderness, to the elves haven, Rivendell, across the Misty Mountains where, escaping from goblins, he meets Gollum and acquires a magic ring. His journey continues via a lucky escape from wargs, goblins, and fire, to the house of Beorn the shapeshifter, through the black forest of Mirkwood, to Lake-town in the middle of Long Lake, and eventually to the Mountain itself.

As burglar, Bilbo is sent down the secret passage to the dragon's lair. He steals a golden cup and takes it back to the Dwarves. Smaug awakes and instantly notices the theft and a draught of cold air from the opened passage. He flies out, nearly catches the Dwarves outside the door, and eats their ponies. Bilbo and the Dwarves hide inside the passage. Bilbo goes down to Smaug's lair again to steal some more, but the dragon is now only half-asleep. Wearing his magic ring, Bilbo is invisible, but Smaug at once smells him. Bilbo has a riddling conversation with Smaug, and notices that the dragon's armour does indeed have a gap. He escapes the dragon's flames as he runs up the passage, and tells the Dwarves about the gap in Smaug's armour. An old thrush hears what he says, and flies off to tell Bard in Lake-town.

Smaug realizes that Lake-town must have helped Bilbo, and flies off in a rage to destroy the town. The Dwarves and Bilbo hear that Smaug has been killed in the attack. The Dwarves reclaim the Lonely Mountain, and horrify Bilbo by refusing to share the dragon's treasure with the lake-men or the wood-elves. Bilbo finds the Arkenstone of Thrain, the most precious heirloom of Thorin's family, but hides it. Thorin calls his relative Dáin to bring an army of Dwarves. Thorin and his dwarves fortify the entrance to the mountain hall, and are besieged by the Wood-elves and Lake-men. Bilbo tries to ransom the Arkenstone to prevent fighting, but Thorin sees his action as betrayal, and banishes Bilbo. Dain arrives, and the army of Dwarves faces off against the armies of Elves and Men. As battle is joined, a host of goblins and wargs arrive to take over the mountain, now that Smaug is dead. The armies of Elves, Men, and Dwarves, with the help of Eagles and Beorn, defeat the goblins and wargs. Thorin is fatally wounded, but has time to make peace with Bilbo. Bilbo accepts only a little of the treasure which was his share, though it still represents great wealth for a Shire hobbit. Bilbo returns to his home in the Shire to find that several of his relatives, believing him to be dead, are trying to claim his home and possessions.

The Lord of the Rings 

The Lord of the Rings begins with Bilbo's "eleventy-first" (111th) birthday, 60 years after the beginning of The Hobbit. The main character of the novel is Frodo Baggins, Bilbo's cousin, who celebrates his 33rd birthday and legally comes of age on the same day. Bilbo has kept the magic ring, with no idea of its significance, all that time; it has prolonged his life, leaving him feeling "thin and stretched". At the party, Bilbo tries to leave with the ring, but Gandalf persuades him to leave it behind for Frodo. Bilbo travels to Rivendell and visits the dwarves of the Lonely Mountain before returning to retire at Rivendell and write books. Gandalf discovers that Bilbo's magic ring is the One Ring forged by the Dark Lord Sauron, and sets in motion the quest to destroy it. Frodo and his friends set off on the quest, finding Bilbo, now obviously old, but spry, in Rivendell. When they have destroyed the Ring, they return to the Shire, via Rivendell, where Bilbo looks "very old, but peaceful, and sleepy". Two years later Bilbo accompanies Gandalf, Elrond, Galadriel, and Frodo to the Grey Havens, there to board ship bound for Tol Eressëa across the sea.

Narrator 

In Tolkien's narrative conceit, in which all the writings of Middle-earth are translations from the fictitious volume of the Red Book of Westmarch, Bilbo is the author of The Hobbit, translator of various "works from the elvish", and the author of the following poems and songs:

 "A Walking Song"
 "All that is gold does not glitter", based on Shakespeare's The Merchant of Venice, which uses "glisters" instead of "glitters"
 "The Man in the Moon Stayed Up Too Late", adapted from the nursery rhyme "Hey Diddle Diddle", supposedly as its ancestral form
 "The Road Goes Ever On"
 "Bilbo's Last Song", describing Bilbo's contemplation of his forthcoming voyage to the Undying Lands.

Interpretations

Name 

The critic Tom Shippey notes that "Baggins" is close to the spoken words bæggin, bægginz in the dialect of Huddersfield, Yorkshire, where it means a substantial meal eaten between main meals, most particularly at teatime in the afternoon; and Mr Baggins is definitely, Shippey writes, "partial to ... his tea". The choice of the surname may be connected to the name of Bilbo's house, Bag End, also the actual name of Tolkien's aunt's farmhouse, which Shippey notes was at the bottom of a lane with no exit. This is called a "cul-de-sac" in England; Shippey describes this as "a silly phrase", a piece of "French-oriented snobbery", and observes that the socially aspiring Sackville-Bagginses have similarly attempted to "Frenchify" their family name, Sac[k]-ville = "Bag Town", as a mark of their bourgeois status. The journalist Matthew Dennison, writing for St Martin's Press, calls Lobelia Sackville-Baggins "Tolken's unmistakable nod to Vita Sackville-West", an aristocratic novelist and gardening columnist as passionately attached to her family home, Knole House, which she was unable to inherit, as Lobelia was to Bag End. The opposite of a bourgeois is a burglar who breaks into bourgeois houses, and in The Hobbit Bilbo is asked to become a burglar (of Smaug the dragon's lair), Shippey writes, showing that the Bagginses and the Sackville-Bagginses are "connected opposites". He observes that the name Sackville-Baggins, for the snobbish branch of the Baggins family, is "an anomaly in Middle-earth and a failure of tone".

Period

Bilbo's period can be defined, Shippey notes, by the presence of tobacco, brought to Europe in 1559, and a postal service, introduced in England in 1840. Like Tolkien himself, Bilbo was "English, middle class; and roughly Victorian to Edwardian", something that as Shippey observes, does not belong to the much older world of elves, dwarves, and wizards.

Character

Marjorie Burns, a medievalist, writes that Bilbo's character and adventures match the fantasy writer and designer William Morris's account of his travels in Iceland in the early 1870s in numerous details. Like Bilbo's, Morris's party set off enjoyably into the wild on ponies. He meets a "boisterous" man called "Biorn the boaster" who lives in a hall beside Eyja-fell, and who tells Morris, tapping him on the belly, "... besides, you know you are so fat", just as Beorn pokes Bilbo "most disrespectfully" and compares him to a plump rabbit. Burns notes that Morris was "relatively short, a little rotund, and affectionately called 'Topsy', for his curly mop of hair", all somewhat hobbit-like characteristics. Further, she writes, "Morris in Iceland often chooses to place himself in a comic light and to exaggerate his own ineptitude", just as Morris's companion, the painter Edward Burne-Jones, gently teased his friend by depicting him as very fat in his Iceland cartoons. Burns suggests that these images "make excellent models" for the Bilbo who runs puffing to the Green Dragon inn or "jogs along behind Gandalf and the dwarves" on his quest. Another definite resemblance is the emphasis on home comforts: Morris enjoyed a pipe, a bath, and "regular, well-cooked meals"; Morris looked as out of place in Iceland as Bilbo did "over the Edge of the Wild"; both are afraid of dark caves; and both grow through their adventures.

Quest

The Christian writer Joseph Pearce describes The Hobbit as "a pilgrimage of grace, in which its protagonist, Bilbo Baggins, becomes grown up ... in wisdom and virtue". Dorothy Matthews sees the story rather as a psychological journey, the anti-heroic Bilbo being willing to face challenges while firmly continuing to love home and discovering himself. Along the way, Matthews sees Jungian archetypes, talismans, and symbols at every turn: the Jungian wise old man Gandalf; the devouring mother of the giant spider, not to mention Gollum's "long grasping fingers"; the Jungian circle of the self, the ring; the escape from the dark underground imprisoning chambers of the wood-elves and Bilbo's symbolic rebirth into the sunlight and the waters of the woodland river; and the dragon guarding the contested treasure, itself "an archetype of the self, of psychic wholeness". Later research has extended Matthews' analysis using alternative psychological frameworks such as Erik Erikson's theory of development.

Genealogy 

The Tolkien scholar Jason Fisher notes that Tolkien stated that hobbits were extremely "clannish" and had strong "predilections for genealogy". Accordingly, Tolkien's decision to include the Baggins and other hobbit family trees in Lord of the Rings gives the book, in Fisher's view, a strongly "hobbitish perspective". The tree also, he notes, serves to show Bilbo's and Frodo's connections and familial characteristics, including that Bilbo was both "a Baggins and a Took". Fisher observes that Bilbo is, like Aragorn: a "distillation of the best of two families"; he notes that in the game The Quest of Erebor, Gandalf is given the (non-Tolkien) lines "So naturally, thinking over the hobbits that I knew, I said to myself, 'I want a dash of the [adventurous] Took ... and I want a good foundation of the stolider sort, a Baggins perhaps.' That pointed at once to Bilbo".

The Tolkien critic Tom Shippey notes that Tolkien was very interested in such names, describing Shire names at length in The Lord of the Rings "Appendix F". One category was the names that meant nothing to the hobbits "in their daily language", like Bilbo and Bungo; a few of these, like Otho and Drogo in the family tree, were "by accident, the same as modern English names".

Adaptations 

In the 1955–1956 BBC Radio serialisation of The Lord of the Rings, Bilbo was played by Felix Felton. In the 1968 BBC Radio serialisation of The Hobbit, Bilbo was played by Paul Daneman.

The 1969 parody Bored of the Rings by "Harvard Lampoon" (i.e. its co-founders Douglas Kenney and Henry Beard) modifies the hobbit's name to "Dildo Bugger".

Nicol Williamson portrayed Bilbo with a light West Country accent in the 1974 performance released on Argo Records. 
In the 1977 Rankin/Bass animated version of The Hobbit, Bilbo was voiced by Orson Bean. Bean also voiced both the aged Bilbo and Frodo in the same company's 1980 adaptation of The Return of the King.

In Ralph Bakshi's 1978 animated version of The Lord of the Rings, Bilbo was voiced by Norman Bird. Billy Barty was the model for Bilbo in the live-action recordings Bakshi used for rotoscoping. The 3000th story to be broadcast in the BBC's long-running children's programme Jackanory was The Hobbit, in 1979. Four narrators told the story with Bilbo's part being played by Bernard Cribbins.

In the BBC's 1981 radio serialisation of The Lord of the Rings, Bilbo is played by John Le Mesurier. In the 1993 television miniseries Hobitit by Finnish broadcaster Yle, Bilbo is portrayed by Martti Suosalo.

In Peter Jackson's films The Fellowship of the Ring (2001) and The Return of the King (2003) Bilbo is played by Ian Holm, who had played Frodo in the BBC radio series 20 years earlier.

Throughout the 2003 video game The Hobbit, the players control Bilbo, voiced by Michael Beattie. The game follows the plot of the book, but adds the elements of platform gameplay and various side-objectives along the main quests. 
In The Lord of the Rings Online (2007) Bilbo resides in Rivendell, mostly playing riddle games with the Elf Lindir in the Hall of Fire.

In Peter Jackson's The Hobbit film series, a prequel to The Lord of the Rings, the young Bilbo is portrayed by Martin Freeman while Ian Holm reprises his role as an older Bilbo in An Unexpected Journey (2012) and The Battle of the Five Armies (2014).

Namesakes 

In astronomy, the asteroid 2991 Bilbo was discovered and named in 1982. The International Astronomical Union names all colles (small hills) on Saturn's moon Titan after characters in Tolkien's work, and in 2012, they named one of these "Bilbo Colles".

In taxonomy, the South African frog Breviceps bagginsi (Bilbo's rain frog) was described in 2003, while a fossil trilobite Marjumia bagginsi from the Cambrian period was described in 1994. Among the beetles named for Bilbo is the "short and robust" Pericompsus bilbo, described in 1974.

See also 

 The Quest of Erebor

Notes

References

Primary 
This list identifies each item's location in Tolkien's writings.

Secondary

Sources 

 
 
 

Middle-earth Hobbits
Adventure film characters
The Lord of the Rings characters
Characters in The Hobbit
Bearers of the One Ring
Literary characters introduced in 1937